Frema Opare, Akosua Frema Osei-Opare (born 1947) is an astute development practitioner, an academic, and a Ghanaian politician. She represented Ayawaso West Wuogon Constituency in the Parliament of Ghana. She is the current and first female Chief of Staff of Ghana.

Early life and education
Frema was born on 5th June 1947. She hails from  Wiamoase in the  Ashanti Region of Ghana. She had her bachelor's degree in Home Science from the University of Ghana. She proceeded to University of Guelph for a master's degree in Food Science.

Career
Frema lectured at the University of Ghana as a lecturer at the Department of Home Science from 1976 to 1982. She eventually became the Head of department. She has also worked with the United Nations in the Women In Fisheries project in various capacities in Uganda, Ethiopia, Congo and Namibia. Frema in 2005 - 2008 worked under the government of President John Agyekum Kufuor as the Deputy Minister for Manpower, Youth and Employment. She also once served a two term office as the Member of Parliament for Ayawaso West Wuogon.

Political career 
Frema is a leading member of the New Patriotic Party. She served a two term office as the member of parliament representing Ayawaso West Wuogon Constituency between 2005 and 2013 under the ticket of the NPP.

2004 Elections 
Opare was elected as the member of parliament for the Ayawaso West-Wuogon constituency in the 2004 Ghanaian General elections. She thus represented the constituency in the 4th parliament of the 4th republic of Ghana. She was elected with 28,636votes out of 54,988 total valid votes cast. This was equivalent to 52.1% of the total valid votes cast. She was elected over Henry Haruna Asante of the People's National Convention, Samuel Adiepena of the National Democratic Congress and Greenstreet Kobina of the Convention People's Party. These obtained 1.0%, 37.9% and 9.0% of the total valid votes cast. Opare was elected on the ticket of the New Patriotic Party.  Her constituency was a part of the 17 constituencies won by the New Patriotic Party in the Greater Accra region in that elections. In all, the New Patriotic Party won a total 128 parliamentary seats in the 4th parliament of the 4th republic of Ghana.

Personal life 
Frema is married with four children. She is a Christian.

References

Living people
New Patriotic Party politicians
University of Ghana alumni
1948 births
Academic staff of the University of Ghana
21st-century Ghanaian women politicians
University of Guelph alumni
Chiefs of Staff of Ghana
Ghanaian MPs 2005–2009
Ghanaian MPs 2009–2013